Ajay Devaloka is an Indian film director, writer, and editor. Mumbai based Malayali Ajay Devaloka began his career in films & advertising as an editor. He was one of the youngest film editors in 2011 when he edited his debut International feature The Last Vision.

‘WHO’ is a directorial debut venture of Ajay Devaloka. He has served as the editor for films such as Saint Dracula 3D, Kamasutra 3D, Anointer, Dancing Death, Katari Veera sura sundrangi 3D, I am From Kolkata, Ennennum Ormmyaykkai and Bul Bul Maina. Some of his other movies are The Last Vision, and Raktharakshassu in Malayalam.

His first movie as a director was Perfectionist in 2012, a thriller road movie produced by E P Varghese. He is currently doing a crime thriller titled Aaram Thirukalpana with Nithya Menen and Shine Tom Chacko produced under the banner Corridor 6 Films, a production company co-founded by Devaloka.

Early life
Ajay Devaloka was born in Calicut, Kerala. After completing Diploma in Animation and VFX, he joined the Department of Studies in Criminology and Forensic Science, Maharaja's College, Mysore.

Career
In 2012, he edited his first movie, Last Vision. As of 2014, he has edited more than twenty movies apart from music videos, film trailers, documentaries, and award-winning shorts.

Also, after 9 years in the industry Ajay Devaloka has cut over 60 AD films (across India and Middle East) in a wide variety of genres as well as TV dramas, online editing for feature films all over India, music videos, film trailers, documentaries and award-winning shorts. His film WHO had its world premiere at Festival De Cannes 2018 in Marche Du. Also, the movie was nominated for best director and best sound in Top Indie Film Awards, 2018.

Isabella

His next movie as director starring Shine Tom Chacko and Rajeev Pillai to have two parts. The movie, said to be the first neo-noir movie in Malayalam, is titled, 'Isabella'. The title was launched by producer GoodKnight Mohan, who was the producer of a movie with the same name in 1988. It is reported that both the movies are different. Isabella is based on real life incidents that happened a century ago in western India. Shruthy Menon will play a pivotal role in Isabella. The music to be composed by Manikandan Ayyappa Writer Shyam Menon will pen the dialogues of the movie, while Thyagu Thavanur Basil is the Art Director. A prequel to Isabella 'WHO' was announced with the same cast of Isabella. The posters of the movie are already out. The shooting is in progress at the valleys of Nainital and Munnar. WHO waddles in magic realism and is said to be based on dream interpretations. Shruthy Menon dons the cape of Arunima, a central character in the movie.

Who
Who a Malayalam time travel film cutting across Sci-Fi, Mystery, Fantasy, Thriller, Magic Realism and noir directed by Ajay Devaloka and produced by Corridor 6 Films is set for Indian theatrical release in 25 October.

Filmography

Awards

References

External links 

Living people
Year of birth missing (living people)
Artists from Kozhikode
Malayalam film editors
Malayalam film directors
Film directors from Kerala
Film editors from Kerala